The fifth season of Bachelor in Paradise premiered on August 7, 2018. Chris Harrison reprised his role from The Bachelor and The Bachelorette as the host of the show.

Production

Casting
During the Women Tell All of the twenty-second season of The Bachelor, host Chris Harrison announced that Bekah Martinez was scheduled to be in Paradise for the upcoming season, but a few months later, she declined to join, due to having a boyfriend. For the first time, it was announced past contestants from the international versions of The Bachelor franchise will join the cast similar to The Bachelor Winter Games and the Australian version. On June 26, 2018, the cast of season 5 of Bachelor in Paradise was announced. After Wills Reid was eliminated during week 7, it was announced that he would be joining the season 5 cast in Paradise. It was announced that Colton Underwood will be joining the cast of season 5 in Paradise after he was eliminated during week 8 after the hometown dates.

Wells Adams returned as the bartender alongside Yuki Kimura from The Bachelor Japan and The Bachelor Winter Games.

The Bachelor
On Tuesday, September 4, 2018 it was revealed that Colton Underwood will be on season 23 of The Bachelor as the next bachelor. There was much speculation that second runner-up Jason Tartick would be the next bachelor and there were many posts on Twitter asking why Jason wasn't going to be the bachelor. It was the third top trending post on Twitter that day.

Contestants

Elimination table

Key
 The contestant is male.
 The contestant is female.
 The contestant went on a date and gave out a rose at the rose ceremony.
 The contestant went on a date and got a rose at the rose ceremony.
 The contestant gave or received a rose at the rose ceremony, thus remaining in the competition.
 The contestant received the last rose.
 The contestant went on a date and received the last rose.
 The contestant went on a date and was eliminated.
 The contestant was eliminated.
 The contestant went on a date and was eliminated.
 The contestant voluntarily left the show.
 The couple had a date, then broke up and were eliminated.
 The couple decided to stay together and won the competition.
 The contestant had to wait before appearing in paradise.
 The contestant split, but later got back together.

Episodes

References

External links
 
 Information about Riviera Nayarit

Paradise 05
2018 American television seasons
Television shows set in Mexico